Plerandra actinostigma is a flowering plant in the family Araliaceae. It was first described in 1968, as Schefflera actinostigma, and is endemic to Vanuatu.

References 

actinostigma
Flora of Vanuatu